List of the participants of the International Steel Sculptor Workshop and Symposium in Dunaújváros'. The colony was established in 1974, which is still active in recent years in Dunaújváros. Art history brief description was published about the colony in 1987. Kunsthalle Budapest was presented the sculptor artists and their artworks between 1983 and 1985.

 Ildikó Bakos
 Balauf Delaney, Karen - United States of America
 Zoltán Bohus
 György Buczkó
 Attila Csáji
 Róbert Csíkszentmihályi
 Sándor Fodor
 Ferenc Friedrich
 Glass, Ingo - Germany
 Gyula Gulyás
 Károly Halász
 Gábor Heritesz
 John Barlow Hudson - United States of America
 Karl, Helmut - Austria
 Klikov, Vladiszlav
 Kofteff, Vladimir - France
 Billy Lee - United States of America
 Tracy Mackenna - Scotland
 József Magyar
 Ferenc Martyn
 Rezső Móder
 Joe Moran - Ireland
 József Palotás
 Ágnes Péter
 Géza Samu
 Mihály Schéner
 József Seregi
 Seynhaeve, Paul - Belgium
 Béla Szeift
 Enikő Szöllősy
 Todor Todorov - Bulgaria
 Tamás Trombitás
 Frits Vanen - Netherlands
 Gyula Várnai
 Tibor Vilt
 Wang, Jin Sheng - United States of America

References
 International Steel Sculptor Workshop and Symposium, Dunaújváros, 1974–1993,

External links
 City center of Dunaújváros

Arts in Hungary